Attorney General Hall may refer to:

David Hall (Australian politician) (1874–1945), Attorney General of New South Wales
Ephraim B. Hall (1822–1898), Attorney General of West Virginia
Philo Hall (1865–1938), Attorney General of South Dakota
Willis Hall (New York politician) (1801–1868), Attorney General of New York